I, or ı, called dotless I, is a letter used in the Latin-script alphabets of Azerbaijani, Crimean Tatar, Gagauz, Kazakh, Tatar, and Turkish. It commonly represents the close back unrounded vowel , except in Kazakh where it represents the near-close front unrounded vowel . All of the languages it is used in also use its dotted counterpart İ while not using the basic Latin letter I.

Implications for ligature use

In some fonts, if the lowercase letters fi are placed adjacently, the dot-like upper end of the f would fall inconveniently close to the dot of the i, and therefore a ligature glyph is provided with the top of the f extended to serve as the dot of the i. A similar ligature for ffi is also possible. Since the forms without ligatures are sometimes considered unattractive and the ligatures make the i dotless, such fonts are not appropriate for use in a Turkish setting. However, the fi ligatures of some fonts do not merge the letters and instead space them next to each other, with the dot on the i remaining. Such fonts are appropriate for Turkish, but the writer must be careful to be consistent in the use of ligatures.

In computing

Usage in other languages

The dotless ı may also be used as a stylistic variant of the dotted i, without there being any meaningful difference between them. This is common in Irish, for example, but is considered simply an omission  of the tittle rather than a separate letter.  In some of the Athabaskan languages of the Northwest Territories in Canada, specifically Slavey, Dogrib and Chipewyan, all instances of i are undotted to avoid confusion with tone-marked vowels í or ì. 

Lowercase dotless  is used as the lowercase form of the letter Í in the official Karakalpak alphabet approved in 2016. 

Both the dotted and dotless I can be used in transcriptions of Rusyn to allow distinguishing between the letters Ы and И, which would otherwise be both transcribed as "y", despite representing different phonemes. Under such transcription the dotted İ would represent the Cyrillic І, and the dotless I would represent either Ы or И, with the other being represented by "Y".

See also
 İ, the letter's dotted counterpart
 Tittle: the dot above "i" and "j" in most of the Latin scripts
 Yery (ы) — a letter used to represent  in Turkic languages with Cyrillic script, and the similar  in Russian
 I with bowl

References

External links
Unicode chart
Tex Texin, Internationalization for Turkish: Dotted and Dotless Letter "I", accessed 15 Nov 2005

Turkish language
I